Diadelia convexicollis is a species of beetle in the family Cerambycidae. It was described by Fairmaire in 1899.

References

Diadelia
Beetles described in 1899